Clifford Nii Amon Kotey also known as Nii Kotey Amon III was a Ghanaian diplomat and a traditional ruler. He was Ghana's ambassador to Morocco from 2009 to 2013. He is currently the Asere Djaasetse of the Ga ethnic group.

Kotey was a Ghanaian foreign service personnel. He began at the Ministry of Foreign Affairs serving as the Assistant Secretary of the Ministry of Foreign Affairs in the 1980s, and Counsellor for political affairs in Ghana's permanent mission to the United Nations in the early 1990s. Prior to his appointment as Ghana's ambassador to Morocco, he served as the acting Head of Ghana's Mission in Berlin. A year after his retirement from the Ghanaian foreign service, he was enstooled Asere Djaasetse, the head of the council responsible for selecting the king for the Ga state.

References 

Year of birth missing (living people)
Living people
Ghanaian diplomats
People from Accra
Ga-Adangbe people
Ambassadors of Ghana to Morocco
Ghanaian civil servants
Alumni of the Accra Academy